Matthew McConaughey is an American actor who made his breakthrough by starring in the Richard Linklater-directed coming of age comedy Dazed and Confused in 1993. His first lead role was in the 1996 film adaptation of the John Grisham novel A Time to Kill. The following year, McConaughey played the lawyer Roger Sherman Baldwin opposite Morgan Freeman and Anthony Hopkins in the Steven Spielberg-directed historical drama Amistad, and also starred opposite Jodie Foster in the Robert Zemeckis-directed science fiction drama Contact. In 1998, he appeared in the Linklater-directed comedy-drama The Newton Boys. During the 2000s, McConaughey was typecast as a romantic comedy lead in the films The Wedding Planner (2001), How to Lose a Guy in 10 Days (2003), Failure to Launch (2006), and Ghosts of Girlfriends Past (2009).

In the early 2010s, McConaughey became better known for his dramatic roles. This reinvention was cited in the media as the "McConaissance" and started when he played Mickey Haller in the adaptation of the Michael Connelly novel of the same name The Lincoln Lawyer, and reunited with Linklater on the black comedy Bernie (both 2011). In the same year he played the title role in the Southern Gothic crime film Killer Joe, for which he received the Saturn Award for Best Actor. The following year he starred in the coming-of-age drama Mud (2012), and also played a supporting role in the Steven Soderbergh-directed comedy drama Magic Mike (2012).

McConaughey's next role was as Ron Woodroof in the 2013 biographical drama Dallas Buyers Club. His performance garnered him the Academy Award for Best Actor, the Golden Globe Award for Best Actor (Drama), and the Screen Actors Guild Award for Outstanding Performance by a Male Actor in a Leading Role. He also appeared in the Martin Scorsese-directed The Wolf of Wall Street in 2013. In 2014, McConaughey played detective Rust Cohle in the television crime drama series True Detective and starred in the Christopher Nolan-directed science fiction film Interstellar. The former earned McConaughey a nomination for the Primetime Emmy Award for Outstanding Lead Actor in a Drama Series and the Critics' Choice Television Award for Best Actor in a Drama Series.

Film

Television

Music videos

See also
 List of awards and nominations received by Matthew McConaughey

References

External links
 

McConaughey, Matthew
American filmographies